Diane Gail North-Saunders  (born March 10, 1944) is a Bahamian historian, archivist, and author.  North-Saunders established the Bahamian National Archives and was the director from 1971 until 2004.  She was the president of the Bahamas Historical Society from 1989 until 1999. North-Saunders was president of the Association of Caribbean Historians; president of the Caribbean Archives Association, and an executive member of the International Council on Archives.  North-Saunders  has authored books about Bahamian history including Historic Bahamas, Islanders in the Stream: A History of the Bahamian People,  and Race and Class in the Colonial Bahamas, 1880–1960.

North-Saunders was one of the four women to first represent The Bahamas in an international sports competition as a member of the sprint relay team at the 1962 Central American and Caribbean Games.

Early life and education
Diane Gail North was born to Edward Basil and Audrey Virginia (Isaacs) North on March 10, 1944. During her high school and college years, she was a superior scholar and athlete.   North represented the country on the sprint relay team at the 1962 Central American and Caribbean Games, in Kingston, Jamaica. At the event, along with Althea Rolle-Clarke, Elaine Thompson, and Christina Jones-Darville, she was one of the four women to first represent The Bahamas in an international sports competition.

North earned a Bachelor of Arts in History in 1966 from University of Newcastle upon Tyne and a postgraduate certificate in Education from the University of Leicester in 1967. She taught history at Government High for two years.

North married Winston Saunders in 1968. The couple relocated to England for further schooling. She studied at University College London and worked at the British Council in Public Record Offices to study process for archiving.  When they moved back to The Bahamas in 1969, Winston took a position as deputy headmaster at Highbury High School.

Upon returning to The Bahamas, North-Saunders took a position at the library in the Ministry of Education where she organized the records of the old Board of Education to make the first deposit in the National Archives.

Saunders studied under historian Michael Craton at the University of Waterloo to earn a doctorate.

National archives 
The Ministry of Education asked North-Saunders to establish the Bahamian National Archives. The archives were held at the Eastern Public Library (the Eastern Post Office) for 16 years. North-Saunders was the director from 1971 until 2004 and director-general of the archives until her retirement in 2008.

North-Saunders was president of the Association of Caribbean Historians; president of the Caribbean Archives Association and an executive member of the International Council on Archives.

Writing 
North-Saunders has authored books about Bahamian history including Historic Bahamas, Islanders in the Stream: A History of the Bahamian People (Volume 1 and 2) with Michael Craton, and Race and Class in the Colonial Bahamas, 1880–1960.

Later life and recognition 
After retirement from the National Archives, North-Saunders remains active in academic pursuits as Scholar-in-residence at the College of The Bahamas. In 2006, her husband Winston died.

Honours 
North-Saunders was awarded the Commonwealth honour of the Order of the British Empire (OBE) in 2003. The University of the West Indies awarded her an honorary degree in 2004. She was inducted into the Bahamas National Sports Hall of Fame in 2013.

References

Living people
Bahamian writers
Bahamian women writers
Bahamian historians
Female archivists
1944 births
Competitors at the 1962 Central American and Caribbean Games
Bahamian female sprinters
Alumni of Newcastle University
University of Waterloo alumni